Marsabit County is a county in Kenya. Covering a surface area of 66,923.1 square kilometres. Marsabit is the second largest county in Kenya. Its capital is Marsabit and its largest town Moyale. According to the 2019 census, the county has a population of 459,785. It is bordered to the North by Ethiopia, to the West by Turkana County to the South by Samburu County and Isiolo County, and to the East by Wajir County.

Geography
The county is located in central north Kenya. It borders the eastern shore of Lake Turkana. The Chalbi Desert makes up much of the center region of the county.

Physical and tropical features 

Climatic conditions 

Demographics 
The county has a total population of 459,785, of which 243,548 are males, 216,219 females and 18 intersex persons. There are 77,495 households, with an average household size of 5.8 persons per household and a population density 6 people per square kilometre.

Population

Religion

Administrative and political units

Administrative units 
There are 4 sub counties, 16 divisions, 63 locations and 127 sub-locations.

Sub-counties 

 Saku
 North Horr
 Laisamis
 Moyale

Electoral constituencies 
There 4 constituencies and 20 county assembly wards.

Moyale Constituency
North Horr Constituency
Saku Constituency
Laisamis Constituency

Political leadership 
Mohamed Mohamud Ali is the Governor and was elected in 2017 and his deputy is Solomon Gubo Riwe. He replaced Ukur Yattani, the first governor of Marsabit county and currently the Cabinet Secretary of National Treasury & Planning. Gordana Hargura is the Senator and has been senator since 2013. Nasra Ibrahim Ibren is the first elected women representative and was replaced in 2017 general elections by Safia Sheikh Adan.

For Marsabit County, the County Executive Committee comprises:-

Source

Members of Parliament 2017-2022 (Marsabit County) 

 Hon. Wario, Qalicha Gufu of Jubilee Party (JP) Member of Parliament Moyale Constituency.
 Hon. Ganya, Francis Chachu of Fap Party Member of Parliament North Horr Constituency.
 Hon. Raso, Dido Ali of Jubilee Party (JP) Member of Parliament Saku Constituency.
 Hon. Arbelle, Marselino of Jubilee Party (JP) Malimo Member of Parliament Laisamis Constituency.

Education 
There are 277 ECD centres 209 primary schools and 31 secondary schools. The county has also 1 teachers training colleges, 4 Youth Polytechnics, 106 adult training institutions and 6 technical training institutions. The number of teachers currently providing basic education in Marsabit county  is 1,912, consisting of 492 ECDE teachers,  1,147 primary and 283 secondary school teachers.

Health 
There is a total of 111 health facilities, hospital beds in the county. County has 457 health personnel of different cadre.

HIV prevalence is at 1% below the national 5.3% (Kenya HIV Estimates 2011).

Transport and communication 

There are two post offices with 1,000 installed letter boxes: 717 rented letter boxes and 283 vacant letter boxes.

Electoral constituencies

Administrative sub-divisions
Administratively,  the  county  is  divided  into four administrative sub-counties namely: Marsabit Central,  Laisamis,  North  Horr, and Moyale.  Sub-counties  are further  divided into 20 wards and administrative villages.

References

External links
 http://softkenya.com/county/marsabit-county/ Marsabit County

 
Counties of Kenya
Eastern Province (Kenya)